The Cliff Dwellers Club is a private civic arts organization in Chicago, Illinois. The Club was founded in 1907 by Chicago author Hamlin Garland as "The Attic Club", On January 18, 1909, the name was formally changed to The Cliff Dwellers. In 1908, Cliff Dwellers entered into a lease for the eighth floor and the ninth-story penthouse above Orchestra Hall (now Symphony Center) at 220 South Michigan Avenue. Garland's model was the New York Players Club.

Mission and purpose 

According to the Cliff Dwellers' Articles of Incorporation, the club was formed to "encourage, foster and develop higher standards of art, literature and craftsmanship; to promote the mutual acquaintance of art lovers, art workers and authors; to maintain in the City of Chicago a club house and to provide therein galleries, libraries and exhibition facilities for the various lines of art, in support of the foregoing purposes." The name of the Club is said to be based on the novel "The Cliff Dwellers" by Henry B. Fuller. Alternatively, it refers to the ancient cliff-dwelling Indians of the Southwest, for a club that is perching on high ledges and values the arts.

History

1907-1996
The club's interior, and the meeting space called the "kiva", was designed by Chicago architect Howard Van Doren Shaw, and featured the mural Navaho by John Warner Norton.  Charter members of the club included Garland's brother-in-law Lorado Taft, a noted sculptor; educator and author William Morton Payne; architect Frank Lloyd Wright; architects A.B. Pond and I.K. Pond; the landscape architect Jens Jensen, and many other civic and cultural figures. The Cliff Dwellers' space in Orchestra Hall was ready for occupancy on January 6, 1909, when inaugural ceremonies were held. Under the original by-laws, the Club's membership was limited to men. Women have been admitted as members since 1984. The Club became a meeting place for artists and lovers of the fine arts, through dinners and programs and performances by many local artists, and the ongoing camaraderie provided by a place to meet, eat and talk at a designated members table which is open to all Cliff Dwellers members.

1996 to now
In 1996, the Cliff Dwellers moved their meeting place from the penthouse above Orchestra Hall (now Symphony Center) to the 22nd floor of the Borg-Warner building. The private club continues to operate as a non-profit organization for men and women either professionally engaged in, or who support, the fine arts and the performing arts. The Club maintains a document collection at the Newberry Library.The Club has continued its tradition of sponsoring programs and performances and providing a space for the lively exchange of ideas.

Past presidents
The Cliff Dwellers has been led by several of its charter members and their tradition has been carried on, with presidents who have been engaged as writers, architects, scholars, publishers and lay members who love and support the arts.

Hamlin Garland (1907-1914)
Charles L. Hutchinson (1915–16)
Karleton Hackett (1917-1918)
William O. Goodman (1919-1920)
Henry Kitchell Webster (1921)
Ralph E. Clarkson (1922-1923)
Horace S. Oakley (1924)
Karl E. Harriman (1925-1926)
Frederick Stock (1927-1928)
Carter Harrison Jr. (1929)
William A. Nitze (1930-1931)
Thomas E. Tallmadge (1932-1933)
Irving K. Pond (1934-1935)
Herbert E. Hyde (1936-1937)
Elmer E. Forsberg (1938-1939)
Ralph Fletcher Seymour (1940-1941)
Charles F. Kelly (1942-1943)
Wilfred E. Garrison (1944-1945)
Ralph Horween (1946-1947)
W.W. Kimball (1948-1949)
Franklin J. Meine (1950-1951)
N. Kellogg Fairbank Jr. (1952-1953)
B. Fred Wise (1954-1955)
R. Vale Faro (1956-1957)
J. Biedler Camp (1958-1959)
Paul D. McCurry (1960-1961)
Leo Sowerby (1962)
Rolfe Renouf (1963-1964)
Addis M. Osborne (1965-1969)
Roy Berg (1969-1972)
Manly W. Mumford (1973-1974)
Henry Regnery (1975-1976)
Irl Marshall (1977)
Leo E. Heim (1978-1979)
Charles F. Harding, III (1980)
J. William Cuncannan (1981-1982)
William J. Isaacson (1983)
Wilbert R. Hasbrouck (1984-1985)
Jerrold R. Zisook (1986-1987)
Gertrude L. Kerbis (1988-1989)
Walker C. Johnson (1990-1992)
Chester R. Davis Jr. (1993-1994)
John A. McDermott (1995-1996)
Karl Zerfoss (1997-1998)
Kristine Fallon (1999)
Allen Kamp (2000-2001)
William M. Getzoff (2002-2003)
Jack W. Zimmerman (2004-2005)
William J. Bowe (2006-2007)
Larry E. Lund (2008-2009)
Brian A. Bernardoni (2010-2011)
Leslie Recht (2012-2013)
Charles R. Hasbrouck (2014-2015)
David Chernoff (2016-2017)
Eve Moran (2018-2019)
Carla J. Funk (2020-2022)

Notable members

Many well-known Chicago figures have been active members of The Cliff Dwellers over the years. Members have included:

 George Ade
 David Adler
 Solon Spencer Beman
 Jacob Burck
 Daniel Burnham
 John Alden Carpenter
 Sir Alfred East
 Roger Ebert
 Arthur Jerome Eddy
 George Fitch
 Wilson Irvine
 Cyrus Hall McCormick II
 William Vaughn Moody
 Horace Sweeney Oakley
 Wallace Rice
 James Whitcomb Riley
 Carl Sandburg
 Joseph Lyman Silsbee
 Adlai Stevenson III
 Louis Sullivan
 Booth Tarkington
 Bert Leston Taylor

Under the Club's by-laws, "any person of reputation for creative work or for distinguished service in the field of literature or arts may be elected an honorary member." Authors Stuart Dybek and Scott Turow, Chicago sculptors Terrence Karpowicz and Richard Hunt, Chicago historian Tim Samuelson, investor and philanthropist Richard Driehaus, photographer and journalist Lee Bey, and architect Carter Manny are recent honorary members of the Club.

Exhibitions, performances, and lectures 

The Club currently has exhibitions of sculpture and visual arts, which are mounted every other month. In addition, the Club hosts numerous events every month, showcasing musicians, dancers, and actors in unique and exciting performances. Over the years, the Club has also opened its doors to many outstanding writers and artists in Chicago for special lectures and programs.

Arts Foundation 

The Cliff Dwellers Arts Foundation operates as a charitable adjunct to the private club. The Foundation's stated mission is to support the arts. Throughout the year, the Foundation provides grants to arts-oriented organizations and individuals, presents performances at the Club, and sponsors an annual music competition. Visual arts grant recipients also often showcase their art at the Club. Funds are contributed by members of The Cliff Dwellers and are distributed biannually.

Affiliate clubs 

The Cliff Dwellers has numerous affiliate clubs across the country and around the world. These include the Arts Club of Chicago and the Quadrangle Club (University of Chicago) (also based in Chicago), the Cosmos Club (based in Washington DC), the Salmagundi Club in New York City, and the Lansdowne Club in London, England.

References

External links 
 The Cliff Dwellers official website
 Cliff Dwellers Club Records at The Newberry Library

1907 establishments in Illinois
Arts organizations based in Illinois
Gentlemen's clubs in the United States
Organizations based in Chicago
Organizations established in 1907